Shenlong is a dragon from Chinese mythology.

Shenlong may also refer to:

Shenlong Space Plane, the Chinese reusable space shuttle
Shenlong (Dragon Ball), a character in Dragon Ball media
Shenlong (Bloody Roar), a character in Bloody Roar media 
Shenlong Gundam, a fictional mecha in Gundam Wing media

See also
Sheng Long

pl:Smok chiński#Rodzaje smoków